Mondo Cannibale (English: Cannibal World ; also known as The Cannibals,  Die Blonde Göttin, White Cannibal Queen, A Woman for the Cannibals and Barbarian Goddess) is a 1980 Spanish-Italian cannibal exploitation film directed by Jesús Franco and stars Al Cliver and a then-17 year old Sabrina Siani. It is one of two cannibal films directed by Franco starring Cliver, the other being Devil Hunter.

Franco's original shooting title was Rio Salvaje, but it was changed to Mondo Cannibale before its release. While not prosecuted for obscenity, the film was seized and confiscated in the UK under Section 3 of the Obscene Publications Act 1959 during the video nasty panic.

Plot 

A father (Al Cliver) attempts to rescue his teenage daughter (Sabrina Siani) from a tribe of man-eating primitives who (unknown to him) have made her their queen.

Cast 
 Sabrina Siani as Lana
 Anouska as Young Lana
 Al Cliver as Jeremy Taylor
 Oliver Mathot as Charles Fenton
 Antonio Mayans as Yakaké
 Lina Romay as Ana
 Jesús Franco as Mr. Martin (uncredited cameo)

Production

Franco said in the interview that he only did the two cannibal films for the money, and said that he had no idea why anyone would want to watch such films. He said that Sabrina Siani was the worst actress that he ever worked with in his life (second only to Romina Power) and that Siani's only good quality was her "delectable derrière".

Reception 

Ian Jane from DVD Talk awarded the film 1.5 out of 5 stars, criticizing the film for its poor acting, ineffective special effects, screenplay, music score, and editing. However, Jane went on to state "there's a strange manic energy to the picture that makes it a lot of fun to watch."

References

External links 
 

1980 films
1980 horror films
1980s exploitation films
Cannibal-boom films
Films directed by Jesús Franco
Films shot in Portugal
1980s Italian-language films
Spanish horror films
Italian erotic horror films
Films scored by Roberto Pregadio
1980s Italian films